A hamartoma is a mostly benign, local malformation of cells that resembles a neoplasm of local tissue but is usually due to an overgrowth of multiple aberrant cells, with a basis in a systemic genetic condition, rather than a growth descended from a single mutated cell (monoclonality), as would typically define a benign neoplasm/tumor. Despite this, many hamartomas are found to have clonal chromosomal aberrations that are acquired through somatic mutations, and on this basis the term hamartoma is sometimes considered synonymous with neoplasm. Hamartomas are by definition benign, slow-growing or self-limiting, though the underlying condition may still predispose the individual towards malignancies.

Hamartomas are usually caused by a genetic syndrome that affects the development cycle of all or at least multiple cells. Many of these conditions are classified as overgrowth syndromes or cancer syndromes. Hamartomas occur in many different parts of the body and are most often asymptomatic incidentalomas (undetected until they are found incidentally on an imaging study obtained for another reason). Additionally, the definition of hamartoma versus benign neoplasm is often unclear, since both lesions can be clonal. Lesions such as adenomas, developmental cysts, hemangiomas, lymphangiomas and rhabdomyomas within the kidneys, lungs or pancreas are interpreted by some experts as hamartomas while others consider them true neoplasms. Moreover, even though hamartomas show a benign histology, there is a risk of some rare but life-threatening complications such as those found in neurofibromatosis type I and tuberous sclerosis.

It is different from choristoma, a closely related form of heterotopia. The two can be differentiated as follows: a hamartoma is an excess of normal tissue in a normal situation (e.g., a birthmark on the skin), while a choristoma is an excess of tissue in an abnormal situation (e.g., pancreatic tissue in the duodenum). The term hamartoma is from the Greek ἁμαρτία, hamartia ("error"), and was introduced by D.P.G. Albrecht in 1904.

Causes 

Hamartomas result from an abnormal formation of normal tissue, although the underlying reasons for the abnormality are not fully understood. They grow along with, and at the same rate as, the organ from whose tissue they are made, and, unlike cancerous tumors, only rarely invade or compress surrounding structures significantly.

Diagnosis

Types

Lung 

About 5–8% of all solitary lung nodules and about 75% of all benign lung tumors, are hamartomas. They almost always arise from connective tissue and are generally formed of cartilage, connective tissue, and fat cells, although they may include many other types of cells. The great majority of them form in the connective tissue on the outside of the lungs, although about 10% form deep in the linings of the bronchi. They can be worrisome, especially if situated deep in the lung, as it is sometimes difficult to make the important distinction between a hamartoma and a lung malignancy. An X-ray will often not provide a definitive diagnosis, and even a CT scan may be insufficient if the hamartoma lacks the typical cartilage and fat cells. Lung hamartomas may have popcorn-like calcifications on chest xray or computed tomography (CT scan).

Lung hamartomas are more common in men than in women, and may present additional difficulties in smokers.

Some lung hamartomas can compress surrounding lung tissue to a degree, but this is generally not debilitating and is often asymptomatic, especially for the more common peripheral growths. They are treated, if at all, by surgical resection, with an excellent prognosis: generally, the only real danger is the inherent possibility of surgical complications.

Heart 

Cardiac rhabdomyomas are hamartomas composed of altered cardiac myocytes that contain large vacuoles and glycogen. They are the most common tumor of the heart in children and infants. There is a strong association between cardiac rhabdomyomas and tuberous sclerosis (characterized by hamartomas of the central nervous system, kidneys, and skin, as well as pancreatic cysts); 25-50% of patients with cardiac rhabdomyomas will have tuberous sclerosis, and up to 100% of patients with tuberous sclerosis will have cardiac masses by echocardiography. Symptoms depend on the size of the tumor, its location relative to the conduction system, and whether or not it obstructs blood flow. Symptoms are usually from congestive heart failure; in utero heart failure may occur. If patients survive infancy, their tumors may regress spontaneously; resection in symptomatic patients has good results.

Nerves

Sometimes nerves can also be affected. The most common nerve to be affected by hamartoma is reported to be median nerve.

Hypothalamus 

One of the most troublesome hamartomas occurs on the hypothalamus. Unlike most such growths, a hypothalamic hamartoma is symptomatic; it most often causes gelastic seizures, and can cause visual problems, other seizures, rage disorders associated with hypothalamic diseases, and early onset of puberty. The symptoms typically begin in early infancy and are progressive, often into general cognitive and/or functional disability. Moreover, resection is usually difficult, as the growths are generally adjacent to, or even intertwined with, the optic nerve. Symptoms tend to be resistant to medical control; however, surgical techniques are improving and can result in immense improvement of prognosis.

Kidneys, stomach, spleen and other vascular organs 

One general danger of hamartomas is that they may impinge into blood vessels, resulting in a risk of serious bleeding. Because a hamartoma typically lacks elastic tissue, it may lead to the formation of aneurysms and thus possible hemorrhage. Where a hamartoma impinges into a major blood vessel, such as the renal artery, hemorrhage must be considered life-threatening.

Angiomyolipoma of the kidney was previously considered to be a hamartoma or choristoma.

A myoepithelial hamartoma, also known as a pancreatic rest, is ectopic pancreatic tissue found in the stomach, duodenum, or proximal jejunum. When seen on upper gastrointestinal series, a pancreatic rest may appear to be a submucosal mass or gastric neoplasm. Most are asymptomatic, but they can cause dyspepsia or upper gastrointestinal bleeding.

A hamartoma has been identified as a cause of partial outflow obstruction in the abomasum (true gastric stomach) of a dairy goat.

Hamartomas of the spleen are uncommon but can be dangerous. About 50% of such cases manifest abdominal pain, and they are often associated with hematologic abnormalities and spontaneous rupture.

Cowden syndrome 

Cowden syndrome is a serious genetic disorder characterized by multiple hamartomas. Usually skin hamartomas exist, and commonly (in about 66% of cases) hamartoma of the thyroid gland exists. Additional growths can form in many parts of the body, especially in bones, CNS, the eyes, the genitourinary tract, the GI tract, and mucosa. The hamartomas themselves may cause symptoms or even death, but morbidity is more often associated with increased occurrence of malignancies, usually in the breast or thyroid. Cowden syndrome is considered a PTEN hamartoma tumor syndrome (PHTS), which also includes Bannayan–Riley–Ruvalcaba syndrome, Proteus syndrome and Proteus-like syndrome.

Prognosis 

Hamartomas, while generally benign, can cause problems due to their location. For example, when located on the skin, especially on the face or neck, they can be very disfiguring. Cases have been reported of hamartomas the size of a small orange. They may obstruct practically any organ in the body, such as the colon, eye, etc. They are particularly likely to cause major health issues when located in the hypothalamus, kidneys, lips, or spleen. They can be removed surgically if necessary, and are not likely to recur. Prognosis will depend upon the location and size of the lesion, as well as the overall health of the patient.

See also 
 Hamartia (medical term)
 List of cutaneous conditions

References

External links 

 
 

Dermal and subcutaneous growths
Anatomical pathology